Ramón Allones is the name of two premium cigar brands, one produced on the island of Cuba for Habanos SA, the Cuban state-owned tobacco company, and other produced in Honduras for General Cigar Company, now a subsidiary of Swedish Match.

History 
The brand was created in Cuba by brothers Ramón and Antonio Allones (no relation to the Antonio Allones of El Rey del Mundo fame) in 1845 and is supposedly the first cigar brand to have utilized colourful lithographs for box art, the first brand to utilise bands on cigars, and the first to package cigars in the "8-9-8" style (though there are several rival claimants as to who first made box art and bands).

The brand went through numerous ownership changes before it was finally bought by the Cifuentes family and production was moved to the famous Partagás Factory, where Ramón Allones cigars are still made to this day.

On September 15, 1960, the revolutionary Cuban government nationalised all Cuban cigar manufacturing and production, including seizure of the Partagas factory where Ramon Allones cigars were manufactured.  The Ramon Allones brand was selected for continued production and continues to be manufactured in Havana. Cuban-made Ramon Allones cigars use are medium-full to full strength in body, and the blend shares some of the characteristics of Partagás as far as overall body, vitolas, and packaging.  It has always been produced in smaller quantities than Partagás.

Since 2001, when Altadis bought a controlling share of Habanos SA, the Ramón Allones marque has seen the majority of its manufactured sizes discontinued, including the much-beloved Coronas and even the 8-9-8 size it helped pioneer.  Of the sizes available now, the Specially Selected, Gigantes, and Small Club Coronas are still incredibly popular among aficionados.

Since 2005, Ramón Allones has been a popular choice with many importers for the Edición Regional series of local market special sizes.  The Belicoso vitola released for the UK market may have been a prototype for the regional edition program, as it appeared first, being imported only to the UK, and without any additional bands or special packaging.

Vitolas in the Ramón Allones Line

The following list of vitolas de salida (commercial vitolas) within the Ramón Allones marque lists their size and ring gauge in Imperial (and Metric), their vitolas de galera (factory vitolas), and their common name in American cigar slang.

Hand-Made Vitolas
 Gigante - 7" × 49 (194 × 19.45 mm), Prominente, a double corona
 Small Club Corona - 4" × 42 (111 × 16.67 mm), Minuto, a petit corona
 Specially Selected - 4" × 50 (124 × 19.84 mm), Robusto, a robusto
Edición Regional Releases
 Selección Suprema (Italy 2005) - 5" × 46 (143 × 18.26 mm) Corona Gorda, a toro
 Eminencia (Switzerland 2005, 2007) - 5" × 44 (143 × 17.46 mm), Francisco, a corona
 Belicoso (UK 2005) -  5" × 52 (140 × 20.64 mm) Campana, a belicoso
 Estupendo (Asia Pacific 2006, 2007) - 7" × 47 (178 × 18.65 mm), Julieta No. 2, a churchill
 Gran Robusto (Benelux 2007, 2008) - 6" × 50 (155 × 19.84 mm) Doble, a double robusto
 Especial de Allones (France 2008) - 5" × 52 (140 × 20.64 mm) Campana, a belicoso
 Phoenicios (Lebanon 2008, 2009) - 6" × 54 (164 × 21.43 mm) Sublime, a double robusto
 Grande (Spain 2008) - 7" × 49 (184 × 19.45 mm) Paco, a churchill
 Celestial Fino (Asia Pacific 2009) - 5" × 46 (137 × 18.26 mm) Británica, a perfecto
 Petit Únicos (Canada 2009) - 5" × 50 (127 × 19.84 mm) Petit Pirámide, a petit pyramid
 Beritus (Lebanon 2009) - 5" × 52 (135 × 20.64 mm) Edmundo, a robusto extra
 Patagón (Chile, Argentina and Uruguay 2016) - (110mm x 52) Petit Edmundo (Source: Cigar Chile Ltd. Habanos Subdistributor for Chile)
Edición Limitada Releases
Allones Extra (Edición Limitada 2011) - 5" × 44 (143 × 17.46 mm), Francisco, a corona

Footnotes
 Min Ron Nee with Adriano Martinez Ruis, An Illustrated Encyclopaedia of Post-Revolution Havana Cigars. Hong Kong: Interpro Business Corp., 2003.
 https://www.cubancigarwebsite.com/brand/ramon-allones

References

External links
 Official website of Habanos S.A.
 Ramon Allones Sizes and Special Releases
 Reviews of Ramon Allones Cigars

See also 
 Cigar brands

Habanos S.A. brands